Di Stefano is a patronymic Italian surname meaning "(the son) of Stephen". Notable people with the surname include:

 Alfredo Di Stéfano (1926–2014), Argentinian-Spanish footballer
 Andrea Di Stefano (born 1972), Italian actor
 Francesco di Stefano (c. 1422–1457), Italian painter
 Giovanni di Stefano (disambiguation), several people
 Giuseppe Di Stefano (1921–2008), Italian tenor
Manlio Di Stefano (born 1981), Italian politician
 Sergio Di Stefano (1939–2010), Italian voice actor
 Vincenzo di Stefano da Verona, Italian painter

Italian-language surnames
Patronymic surnames
Surnames from given names